Sand Lake is an unorganized territory in Saint Louis County, Minnesota, United States, located within the unincorporated area of Britt. The population was 1,130 at the 2020 census.

Geography
According to the United States Census Bureau, the unorganized territory has a total area of 34.4 square miles (89.1 km2); 32.7 square miles (84.8 km2) is land and 1.6 square miles (4.3 km2) (4.80%) is water.

Demographics
At the 2000 census there were 1,060 people, 401 households, and 326 families living in the unorganized territory. There were 468 housing units at an average density of 14.3/sq mi (5.5/km2). The racial makeup of the unorganized territory was 97.55% White, 0.85% Native American, 0.75% Asian, and 0.85% from two or more races. Hispanic or Latino of any race were 0.75%.

Of the 401 households 31.2% had children under the age of 18 living with them, 74.8% were married couples living together, 3.0% had a female householder with no husband present, and 18.7% were non-families. 14.5% of households were one person and 3.0% were one person aged 65 or older.  The average household size was 2.64 and the average family size was 2.91.

The age distribution was 24.2% under the age of 18, 5.0% from 18 to 24, 25.1% from 25 to 44, 35.2% from 45 to 64, and 10.5% 65 or older.  The median age was 43 years. For every 100 females, there were 108.3 males.  For every 100 females age 18 and over, there were 108.6 males.

The median household income was $52,760 and the median family income  was $56,458. Males had a median income of $46,371 versus $23,906 for females. The per capita income for the unorganized territory was $21,169.  About 5.8% of families and 5.4% of the population were below the poverty line, including 3.9% of those under age 18 and 22.4% of those age 65 or over.

References

Populated places in St. Louis County, Minnesota
Unorganized territories in Minnesota